Larry Vella (15 March 1946 – 10 June 1997) was a Maltese sports shooter. He competed in the mixed trap event at the 1980 Summer Olympics.

References

External links

1946 births
1997 deaths
Maltese male sport shooters
Olympic shooters of Malta
Shooters at the 1980 Summer Olympics
Place of birth missing